"Surrender to Me" is a 2022 single by FireCityFunk first written and recorded in 1978, but remained unreleased until 2022 when it became subject of a viral TikTok video by the son of Curly Smith, who co-wrote the song and provided its vocals. Following the viral spread of the song, Smith's son persuaded him to release the song and after a three-week remastering session, the song was released digitally on February 4, 2022, under the name FireCityFunk. Smith later performed the song live on Jimmy Kimmel Live!

References 

1978 songs